Sándor Krizán (born 1968) is a retired Hungarian footballer.

Club career 
Krizán was playing with Nyíregyháza Spartacus FC when he played for Hungary at the European youth championship. Later he played with Budapest Honvéd FC and Szombathelyi Haladás in the Nemzeti Bajnokság I, Hungarian top-league.  He also played with Diósgyőri VTK in 1989.  He had one spell abroad, it was with OFK Kikinda playing in the 1990–91 Yugoslav Second League.

After retiring, he worked as businessman in the private sector, but on August 1, 2013, he returned to football, this time to become sports director of Nyíregyháza Spartacus FC. He was later sports director of second level side Aqvital FC Csákvár, a post he held until January 1, 2015, when he resigned after receiving an invitation to work within the Hungarian Football Federation.

International career 
He played with the Hungarian national U-19 team at the 1984 UEFA European Under-18 Championship becoming part of the generation that won that tournament.

Honors
Hungary U-18
UEFA European Under-18 Championship: 1984

References 

1968 births
Living people
Hungarian footballers
Hungarian expatriate footballers
Budapest Honvéd FC players
Szombathelyi Haladás footballers
Nemzeti Bajnokság I players
Diósgyőri VTK players
OFK Kikinda players
Expatriate footballers in Yugoslavia
Hungarian expatriate sportspeople in Yugoslavia
Association football midfielders